The 2017–18 Biathlon World Cup – Pursuit Women started on Sunday 3 December 2017 in Östersund and will finish on Saturday 24 March 2018 in Tyumen. The defending titlist is Laura Dahlmeier of Germany.

Competition format
The  pursuit race is skied over five laps. The biathlete shoots four times at any shooting lane, in the order of prone, prone, standing, standing, totalling 20 targets. For each missed target a biathlete has to run a  penalty loop. Competitors' starts are staggered, according to the result of the previous sprint race.

2016–17 Top 3 standings

Medal winners

Standings

References

Pursuit Women